Covi is a surname of Italian origin. Notable people with this surname include:

 Alessandro Covi (born 1998), Italian cyclist rider
 Andrea Covi (born 1968), Italian sprint canoer 
 Francis Covi (1906-1966), Dahomeyan politician and educator
 Carlo Covi (born 1961), Italian Venetist politician
 Tizza Covi (born 1978), Italian screenwriter and director

See also 
 Covini Engineering, Italian car manufacturer 

Italian-language surnames

it:Covi